is a Japanese professional golfer.

Kuwabara played on the Japan Golf Tour, winning once.

Professional wins (1)

Japan Golf Tour wins (1)

References

External links

Japanese male golfers
Japan Golf Tour golfers
Sportspeople from Ehime Prefecture
1969 births
Living people